Jesus Piece is an American metalcore band from Philadelphia, Pennsylvania, formed in 2015. They are known for their chaotic live shows and signed to Southern Lord Records in 2018 with the release of their debut Only Self. They have since toured with acts such as Code Orange, Knocked Loose, and Ghostemane.

History
The band formed in 2015 with the current line up consisting of Aaron Heard on vocals, along with guitarists David Updike and John DiStefano, bassist Anthony Marinaro and drummer Luis Aponte.

They self-released their first demo/EP in the same year, followed by a self-released EP in the summer of 2016.

In 2017, they did a split EP with Malice at the Palace which was released through Bridge Nine Records.

In 2018, the band signed to Southern Lord Records and released their full-length debut Only Self on August 24 of that year. Only Self received positive reviews from critics being noted for its punishing and heavy sound.

In November 2019 a show Jesus Piece opened for Ghostemane in Austin, Texas was shut down when the latter 'threatened to shoot up the venue after his brother's nose got broken by venue security'. By that point Jesus Piece already finished their set.

In March 2020, it was announced that they will be supporting Code Orange's headlining tour this year along with Show Me the Body, Year of the Knife, and Machine Girl. This tour was postponed indefinitely due to the COVID-19 Pandemic. October 2022 it was announced that Jesus Piece would join Show Me The Body for the 36-date North America leg of their World War Tour. 

On 5 December 2022, the band released the single "An Offering to the Night." On 20 January 2023, the band announced their sophomore LP ...So Unknown would be released 14 April 2023 via Century Media Records. This was accompanied by the release of the single "Gates of Horn." A month later the band released yet another track of the upcoming album called "Tunnel vision".

Musical style and influences
Jesus Piece has been described as metalcore and hardcore punk by multiple media outlets. In an interview with CVLT Nation, Aaron Heard described the band's influences for their debut album as "anything from brutal and old school death metal to straight-up punk and hardcore influences this band. We started this band to be straight-up death metal but it evolved into what the EP was." In the same interview, when asked about the evolution of the sound compared to earlier releases, Aaron mentioned, "We came together pretty quickly so after a few years we're finally becoming totally comfortable with what we want to do. I know we're really not trying to pull any direct influences so it's made the writing process harder but it's worth it. We just want to make unique metallic hardcore that we want to hear."

Pitchfork's Andy O'Connor described their sound and his opening thoughts with "Jesus Piece rage at the nexus of hardcore, death metal, industrial, and '90s metalcore. They're part of a new metalcore movement that proves that experimentation and succinct, clobbering riffs can not only coexist, but make for natural partners. On their first full-length, Only Self, they make the case that such should be the new tradition."

Metal Injection's J. Andrew mentions his thoughts on their sound in his review for Only Self "Jesus Piece plays a satisfying brutal style of hardcore that rides several lines – beatdown, slam, metalcore – while still maintaining a consistent, recognizable feel."

Members
Aaron Heard – vocals
David Updike – guitars
John Distefano – guitars
Anthony Marinaro – bass
Luis Aponte – drums
Touring Members

 Alexander Cejas -- bass (2023-present)

Discography
Studio albums
Only Self (2018, Southern Lord)
...So Unknown (2023, Century Media)

EPs 

 Jesus Piece (2016, Get This Right Records)
 3 Song Tape (aka Summer '16 Promo) [self-released, 2016)
 Split w/ Malice at the Palace (Bridge 9 Records, 2017)

Singles 

 "Curse of the Serpent" (2018, Southern Lord)
 "Neuroprison" (2018, Southern Lord)
 "Punish" (2018, Southern Lord)
 "Punish (Kilbourne Remix)" (2020, Southern Lord)
 "An Offering to the Night" (2022, Century Media)
 "Gates of Horn" (2023, Century Media)

References

Metalcore musical groups from Pennsylvania
Hardcore punk groups from Pennsylvania